Nilmoni Tagore (1721–1791) was a scion of Tagore family who, founded the Jorasanko branch of Tagore family leaving the old house of Pathuriaghata. In year 1758, he started to build what is now known as Jorasanko Thakur Bari. Nilmoni and Darpnarayan were two sons of Jairam Thakur, who was employed with British East India Company. While Darpnarayan developed his business and lands, Nilmoni chose to serve British and rose to the Serishtadarship of District Court. He received an amount of Rupees One lakh from his brother Darpnarayan, as a settlement amount of family dispute and shifted to Jorasanko and built house there.

He had three sons, Ramlochan Tagore (1759-1804),  Rammoni Tagore (1759-1833) and Rambullav Tagore (1767-1824). Rammoni Tagore had three sons, Radhanath, Dwarkanath and Ramanath Tagore Ramlochan Tagore had no son, so he adopted the second son of his brother Rammoni, the legendary Dwarkanath Tagore, who was illustrious and under him the fortunes of Jorasanko branch of Tagore touched high.

References

1721 births
1791 deaths
Bengali Hindus
18th-century Bengalis
Tagore family
People from Kolkata
Businesspeople from West Bengal